Sein can refer to:

Places
Île-de-Sein, an island and commune in Brittany, France
Raz de Sein, a stretch of water in Brittany, France

People
Given name
Sein Aye, birthname of Sitt Nyein Aye (born 1956), Burmese artist
Sein Hlaing (1918-2010), Burmese footballer and coach
Sein Lwin (1923-2004), Burmese politician, 6th President of the Union of Burma
Po Sein (1882-1954), Burmese actor, singer and dancer
U Sein Than, Burmese land reform activist
Thein Sein (born 1945), Burmese politician and military commander, 8th President of Myanmar

Surname
Mai Šein (born 1946), Estonian architect

Fictional characters
Sein, character in Magical Girl Lyrical Nanoha Strikers

Other
 SEIN: Société d'encouragement pour l'industrie nationale, organization established in 1801 to encourage French industry